María Victoria Gutiérrez Cervantes (born 26 February 1927) is a Mexican actress, singer, and comedian. She is best known for starring in the Telesistema Mexicano sitcom La criada bien criada and its 1972 spin-off film of the same name as maid Inocencia.

Early life
María Victoria was born on 26 February 1927 in Guadalajara. In 1957 she married the popular singer and Yucatecan speaker Rubén Zepeda Novelo until his death in 1974, with whom she had two children: Rubén y Alejandro. María Victoria married again, to Manuel Gómez, with whom she had a daughter, María Esther 'Teté' Gómez, shortly after they separated.

Career
She has appeared in almost forty films and almost fifteen television productions.  One of the first breakthroughs she had as an artist was with Paco Miller. She was a replacement. At that time she has said that she never headlined and never felt that she was a star. But at that moment she really didn't care.  When her career started to take off she would "Thank God," because she never expected the success. She recently said in a celebration in honor of her 65 years in the entertainment industry, to Siempre TV, "The first song I recorded was, Soy feliz; before that, I was always singing everyone else's songs because I didn't have my own."  It was a hit song, with Luis Alcaraz. She song that followed was Todavía no me muero.

In one of Mexico's biggest radio stations XEQ, she was able to work alongside Roberto Cañedo both together in leading roles.

Her debut was with Serenata en Acapulco(1951), she shared the screen with Andrés Soler as Tizoc. She also did Amor perdido, with María Luisa Landín, and included her music as part of the soundtrack.  Monte de Piedad followed with another credit and a song, Alma.  The cast included Jorge Mistral, Miroslava, and Joaquin Cordero. Puerto de tentación was done with Alfredo Rosas Priego, whose family later produced films. In Mujeres de teatro she worked with another big star of the time, Rosita Fornés.

In 1952 she worked on Porque peca la mujer (Why a Woman Sins) she worked with another unforgettable cast, Leticia Palma, Luis Aguilar, Pedro Vargas and Cuco Sánchez. Póker de ases she starred with Luis Aguilar and "Tun Tun". Cuando los hijos pecan brought a new cast for her with Meche Barba, Carlos Orellana and Silvia Pinal. The same year she would also do the villain in the film Porque peca la mujer, where she would actually kill someone. We also saw the release of her film, "Había una vez un marido," with Rafael Baledón and directed by Fernando Méndez.

The success of her films and participation brought her a new found success, and as she was asked to appear on films she started the momentum of her career with strong record sales. She achieved gold and platinum certifications.  In 1953 she followed her film career with La mujer desnuda once again with Luis Aguilar and Meche Barba. She is also recognized for singing in the film.

María Victoria began a new phase in her singing career and as an actress, with the interest of Ismael Rodriguez in her, they filmed Del rancho a la televisión sharing credits with Luis Aguilar.  He announced her as the Woman "Cantinflas." She played the villain. Her character was Graciela Del Mar.  She sang many songs on this film, including a duet with Luis Aguilar.

In 1953, recognized celebrity Pedro de Lille gave her a unique title for her "pujidito," [little moan], La cancionera del suspenso en la garganta – The songstress with the suspended air. She also filmed the movie "Solamente una vez" with Carlos Véjar as director.

In 1954 she filmed Al son del charlestón, with Pompín Iglesias, whom she would act with along her entire career. She followed-up with another film, Solamente una vez. She continued to rise in popularity with her acting and music, she sang the theme song to her following film Estoy taan enamorada, with director and writer Jaime Salvador.

In 1955 she would start the trilogy.  The first installment is Los paquetes de Paquita – Paquita's Packages. She did the film with Ismael Rodriguez known for making 32 feature-length movies with Pedro Infante. His productions would be watched in Germany, Italy, Russia, and other big Latin markets.

The second installment of the trilogy started the following year, Cupido pierde a Paquita – Cupid loses Paquita. The film was a success, which included music, that she would later release in her 65th anniversary CD Triunfo del amor.  She has always given the credit to Rodriguez for giving her the belief in her talent, and has been quoted as saying, she would be the "female, Cantinflas".

In 1956 she would continue to give fruit to her success as a singer in Una movida chueca – A Funny Move with comedian Clavillazo. Other great film actors participate such as Yolanda Varela, Ramón Valdés, Pedro Vargas, Joaquín Pardavé, Lola Beltrán and Marga Lopez.

She also filmed a movie with an American actor, Andy Russell, titled, ¡Viva La Juventud! in which also Adalberto "Resortes" Martínez, Yolanda Varela and Lorena Velázquez acted in. She sang in the movie, Mi último fracaso (My Last Failure), which became one of her classic songs.

María Victoria was the youngest of the artists of that era, in her next film she acted only with the great ones, Lola Beltran, Pedro Vargas, Joaquín Pardavé and Manuel "Loco" Valdés in the film Pensión de Artistas, directed by Adolfo Fernández Cortez. This a film that kept opening doors for her in future projects. She was also invited to sing in the film with Lola Beltran, Pedro Vargas, Lucho Gatica and José Alfredo Jiménez. She sang her classic Como Un Perro – Like A Dog.

In 1957 she followed her success in this film with number one records on the radio, she recorded two new songs for Muerto de risa, she recorded Eso – That, and Está sellado – It's Sealed. She starred in the movie with Resortes. The film was close to her life, it had to do with the circus environment.

In 1958 came Pepito y los robachicos with Lucho Gatica, Arturo Castro "Bigotón," directed by Mauricio de la Serna.

She then followed with Música en la noche with Lola Beltrán, Evangelina Elizondo, Miguel Aceves Mejía and Pedro Vargas.  The director, Tito Davison, from Chile, carried this production into new territories never seen before, like Spain and some South American countries.

Mientras el cuerpo aguante came next with Pompin Iglesias and Blanca Castejón, directed by Gilberto Martinez Solares. Here she sang varias songs such as "Ruleta" and "Judas." It was a cinderella story, a fairy god mother who shares her fortune with her god daughter. Mier Productions releases this film along with "Cantinflas" first three films.

In 1959 Cada quién su música followed suit, with Mauricio de la Serna as director. The film had international stars that were known all over the continent.  The actors in the film were Lucho Gatica, José Alfredo Jiménez, Begoña Palacios, Manuel "Loco" Valdés and Pedro Vargas.  María Victoria participated in the recording of the soundtrack.

In 1961 came a wonderful picture, "Tres balas perdidas," directed by Roberto Rodríguez, from the Rodríguez family, who along with Ismael Rodríguez had directed María Victoria in five other films. He reunited an all-star cast; she was paired with Javier Solís, another music and acting legend, with Rosita Quintana, Evangelina Elizondo who with María Victoria where the three lost bullets, who were given with an inheritance but with a stipulation that they had to marry in a month period of time or lose the fortune. The other two lead actors were Julio Aldana and Venezuelan actor Óscar Pulido. One of the songs sung by all six was "Tres ositos – Three Little Bears."

In 1967 María Victoria acted with Lola Beltrán in her critically acclaimed film, Cucurrucucú Paloma, and sang with her the theme song. The film was directed by Fernando Cortés. Also, Armando Manzanero, a prestigious composer, accompanied María Victoria for his first time on an international tour. At the time he would only be known has a piano player and composer. In the long run he would give her two original songs.

The night María Victoria met The Beatles. It was in New York; at a concert performance, they would be affectionate with her daughter.

In 1970 she met Juan Gabriel. He was her inspiration. He has stated that at that moment in time, she could not have so much love inside her body. He then moved by her wrote the song, 17 años. It was a massive success.  In 1972 she filmed "La criada bien criada," the mega successful feature-length film with Alejandro Suárez, Xavier López Chabelo, and Jorge Lavat.

In 1974, Juan Gabriel was a special guest actor in her television series, La Criada Bien Criada. He was there the whole season. Other actors who intervened in the program were Ernesto Alonso and Silvia Pinal.

Maria Victoria's first charted in Billboard Magazine on 10 July 1976 was with a song written by Juan Gabriel titled "17 Años – 17-years-old," and by September it had reached the Top 10, on Billboard's Hits of The World.

In 1977 she filmed A fuego lento (Mexico nocturno) with Óscar Chávez, Gilberto Pérez Gallardo and María Luisa Landín, directed by Juan Ibáñez.

In 1980 she began to work abroad.  She recently told Cinetoma, a film and cinematography monthly newspaper and magazine, Angeles Castro and Clara Sanchez, "They gave me an exclusive deal to do a film in Spain, I don't know how they did it, they had the idea of having me play Sor Metiche – The Nosy Nun, it was a Spain – Mexico production; it was a Mariano Ozores film." In this film, once again she was asked to record the soundtrack for the film. But the music officially wouldn't be released until 2014, in her album Triunfo del amor – Love's Triumph which is a song that was selected from this film as the album title.

The film had such an impact globally that Spain asked her for another film, El chango me agarró la mano – The Monkey Got My Hand. 
María Victoria was surrounded by children actors whose environment was in the circus, this was a total comedy. It was similar to a curious George with María Victoria.

In 1984 she began another hit television series titled, Mis huéspedes. In the series she would interpret two characters, Inocencia and herself, María Victoria.  She would be the maid Inocencia, and María Victoria the singer, and she would sing her songs.

In the midst of the 1985 Mexico City earthquake, María Victoria had sold out performances of her show. She was a box office film star, theater star, and recording artist.

Victoria appeared as Felipa in the Mexican telenovela Sortilegio (2009).

Known in Texas for her recurrent television commercials for supermarket Fiesta where she appears as Inocencia.

As a singer, she has recorded over 100 records. On 23 September 2014, she launched her album titled, Triunfo del amor – Love's Triumph, a 65 Anniversary, music from her films by MAXD.  The collection includes 10 songs, and 3 bonus.  Mexico has once again responded to her music, and she has regained popularity in Venezuela, Ecuador and Argentina.

Theater

La criada mal criada theater production opened in 1968 with María Victoria, Joaquín Cordero and Rogelio Guerra. The second place the production ran was in the Jorge Negrete Theater The show gave her a record-breaking recognition of over 2,800 live performances. This production lasted five years.  She was also given the best comedian award in 1970 for this production by Premios de la Agrupación de Periodistas Teatrales (APT). Her performances of Perfume de gardenia (2011–2013) hasn't yet been considered in how performances she did. She has also starred in four different festivals.

Television
María Victoria also did television specials sponsored by Nescafé. In the '60s she did some work with her husband in the same televised specials with Nescafé. She followed the success with other guests like Mario Moreno "Cantinflas".

Tour
 San Francisco, California, USA (1950)
 Lima, Perú (1952)
 Corona Variedades (1955)
 Million Dollar Theater, California, USA (1956)
 Guatemala (1956)
 Lima, Perú (1956–1957)
 María Victoria Gran Variedad, Guadalajara, México (1958)
 Caracas, Venezuela (1960)
 Teatro Blanquita, Mexico City (1962–1963)
 San Juan, Puerto Rico (1965)
 Guadalajara, México (1970)
 Tour Headlined with Juan Gabriel, USA (1970)
 Million Dollar Theater, California, USA (1977)

Discography

Filmography

Awards and recognitions
 Gold Record for Soy feliz (1950)
 Platinum Mucho, mucho, mucho (1951)
 Platinum Qué bonito siento (1952)
 Platinum Dancero (1953)
 Platinum Quiero aprender (1954)
 Platinum Mil besos (1955)
 Platinum Mi último fracaso (1956)
 Recognized as "Queen" of the Studios Churrubuscos Azteca (1957)
 Awarded Medal in Mexico (1963)
 Gold Microphone Award given by the National Radio Association (1967)
 Plaque given to her for 1,500 performances for La criada malcriada given by RCA (1967)
 Gold Record "Disco Metro" from RCA The most selling artist of the year (1968)
 Plaque given by Cantinflas for over 2,800 live performances of La criada malcriada (1970)
 Best Actress given The National Theatre Academy (1971) Premios de la Agrupación de Periodistas Teatrales (APT)
 Trophy, Texas, USA (1974)
 Plaque By Teatro Blanquita for 30 Years of Success (1980)
 Silver Goddess Award, from Spain for Sor Metiche (1981)
 Mr. Amigo Award, from Texas (1994)
 Medal, The Jose Clemente Orozco, Guadalajara, MEX. (2000)
 La Diosa de Plata por Trayectoria (2006)
 Premio Inmortal, Ciudad de México, MEX (2015)
Placa Presea, Ray Tico Internacional, Costa Rica (2015)

Partial television work

Notes

External links

1933 births
Living people
Golden Age of Mexican cinema
Mexican women singers
Mexican film actresses
Mexican women comedians
Mexican television actresses
Mexican telenovela actresses
Actresses from Guadalajara, Jalisco